Austin is the capital of Texas in the United States.

Austin may also refer to:

Geographical locations

Australia
 Austin, Western Australia

Canada
 Austin, Manitoba
 Austin, Ontario
 Austin, Quebec
 Austin Island, Nunavut

France
 Saint-Austin, hamlet at la Neuville-Chant-d'Oisel, Normandy

Hong Kong 
 Austin station (MTR), Kowloon

United States
 Austin, Arkansas
 Austin, Colorado
 Austin Township, Macon County, Illinois
 Austin, Chicago, Cook County, Illinois
 Austin, Indiana
 Austin, Kentucky
 Austin, Minnesota
 Austin, Missouri
 Austin, Nevada
 Austin, Ohio
 Austin, Oregon
 Austin, Pennsylvania
 Austin, Texas
 Austin County, Texas (note that the city of Austin, Texas is located in Travis County)

Schools
 Austin College, Sherman, Texas
 University of Texas at Austin, flagship institution of the University of Texas System
 Austin Peay State University, Clarksville, Tennessee

Religion
 Augustine of Hippo
 An adjective for the Augustinians

Business
 American Austin Car Company, short-lived American automobile maker
 Austin Automobile Company, short-lived American automobile company
 Austin Motor Company, British car manufacturer
 Austin magazine, produced for the Austin Motor Company by in-house Nuffield Press
 Austin cookies and crackers, Keebler Company brand

Entertainment
 "Austin" (song), a single by Blake Shelton
 Austin, a kangaroo Beanie Baby produced by Ty, Inc.
 Austin the kangaroo from the children's television series The Backyardigans

Other uses
 Austin (building), a building designed by artist Ellsworth Kelly under construction in Austin, Texas
 Austin (given name), a short form of Augustin, or Augustine, including fictional characters
 Austin (surname)
 USS Austin, three ships

See also
 All pages beginning with Austin
 August (disambiguation)
 Augustin (disambiguation)
 Augustine (disambiguation)
 Austin station (disambiguation)
 Austins (disambiguation)
 Austen (disambiguation)
 Justice Austin (disambiguation)
 Austinburg (disambiguation)